Bacillus halmapalus is a facultative anaerobe bacterium. It is a gram positive, alkaliphilic and alkalitolerant, aerobic endospore-forming bacteria.

References

External links
UniProt entry
SCOP Berkley entry
Type strain of Bacillus halmapalus at BacDive -  the Bacterial Diversity Metadatabase

halmapalus
Bacteria described in 1995